Chadefaudiella is a genus of fungi in the family Chadefaudiellaceae.

Species
As accepted by Species Fungorum;
 Chadefaudiella quezelii 
 Chadefaudiella thomasii

References

Microascales